Joseph Guilherme Raposo, OIH (February 8, 1937 – February 5, 1989) was an American composer, lyricist, songwriter, singer, and pianist, best known for his work on the children's television series Sesame Street, for which he wrote the theme song, as well as classic songs such as "Bein' Green", "C Is For Cookie" and "Sing" (later a #3 hit for The Carpenters). He also wrote music for television shows such as The Electric Company, Shining Time Station and the sitcoms Three's Company and The Ropers, including their theme songs. In addition to these works, Raposo also composed extensively for three Dr. Seuss TV specials in collaboration with the DePatie-Freleng Enterprises: Halloween Is Grinch Night (1977), Pontoffel Pock, Where Are You? (1980), and The Grinch Grinches the Cat in the Hat (1982).

Early life and education
Raposo was born in Fall River, Massachusetts, the only child of Portuguese immigrant parents Joseph Soares Raposo and Maria (a.k.a. "Aunt" Sarah) da Ascenção Vitorino Raposo. He was known as "Sonny" to his family.
Joseph Sr. was an accomplished musician, classical guitarist, violinist, flutist, pianist, music teacher and Joe's first music teacher.

He was a graduate of B.M.C. Durfee High School in Fall River. A 1958 graduate of Harvard College, he was well known for writing the scores for several Hasty Pudding shows there. He was also a graduate of the École Normale de Musique de Paris, where he studied with Nadia Boulanger.

Career

Early years
Raposo worked in musical theater both before and after his work for the Children's Television Workshop and Sesame Street; musical theater was where he first encountered future collaborator Jim Henson. According to Jonathan Schwartz, during the mid-1960s, before Sesame Street, Raposo performed side music in piano bars in Boston to make ends meet, and also served as pianist and music director for a jazz trio working at Boston's WNAC-TV. Upon hearing Raposo's musical skill, Schwartz claims in his autobiography he urged Raposo to give up piano bar playing in Boston and move to New York City. Raposo's decision to take Schwartz's suggestion and move in 1965 eventually led him to his fated meeting with Henson, to Sesame Street, and toward international fame.

Raposo was the musical supervisor and arranger of the original off-Broadway run of You're a Good Man, Charlie Brown, and he contributed additional music to that show. He was also responsible for the memorable theme music for New York City television station WABC-TV's The 4:30 Movie; the piece, called "Moving Pictures," was also used for the station's other movie shows, and subsequently by ABC's other owned-and-operated stations.

Sesame Street
Raposo is best known for the songs he wrote for Sesame Street from its beginning in 1969 through the mid-1970s, and also for a time in the 1980s. He wrote the "Sesame Street Theme" – various versions of which have opened every episode – as well as many of its most popular songs, such as "Bein' Green",  "C is for Cookie", "Sing" and "ABC-DEF-GHI". A version of "Sing" recorded by The Carpenters in 1973 reached #3 on the Billboard top singles chart. For many years, most of the music used in Sesame Streets film segments was also written — and often sung — by Raposo.

Aside from his musical contributions, Raposo performed several uncredited stock characters on Sesame Street during the early 1970s. According to his son Nicholas in a 2002 telephone conversation, Joe Raposo usually chose to portray anonymous, silly characters in these segments, which were nearly always produced on 16 mm film. He also did voice-overs for a few animated segments.

The Sesame Street character Don Music maintained a framed and autographed glamour photograph of Raposo on the wall of his Muppet atelier.

Raposo was very fond of sweets according to many who knew him. One favorite food of his was cookies. It has been rumored the Wheel-Eating Monster created for commercial advertisers in the 1960s by Jim Henson may have been altered by Henson specifically into a "cookie" monster after Henson observed Raposo's unusual propensity for cookies; this has never been substantiated. His widow Pat Collins-Sarnoff celebrated his life with a milk and cookies reception.

One of Raposo's Sesame Street compositions, "The Square Song", was used in the film Close Encounters of the Third Kind.

Other work in children's television
In 1971, Children's Television Workshop created the show The Electric Company, meant to help teach reading to children who had outgrown Sesame Street. Raposo served as the musical director of the show for its first three seasons, and contributed songs throughout the show's run, until 1977.

Raposo performed joke characters for film segments on The Electric Company similar in style to what he had done on Sesame Street. One segment showed him attempting to get dressed in jacket and necktie against a white wall under the word "dressing", until the prefix "un-" appears and attaches itself to the prior word, forcing him to engage in a mock striptease which ends with him modestly hopping off-screen and tossing the remainder of his clothing into an empty chair left on-screen. In a variation of this film, he is shown packing a suitcase when the "un-" prefix returns and pesters him using the behavior of a meddling fly until, exasperated, Raposo strikes the word with a hammer, knocking it unconscious into the suitcase, which he then triumphantly slams shut with a smirk.

Raposo enjoyed doing animation voicework. Other forays of his into the craft included both the tenor singing role of "master pickler" Gil Gickler in DePatie-Freleng's Dr. Seuss cartoon program Pontoffel Pock, Where Are You? and Gickler's spoken dialogue. Raposo also performed at least three other character voices in the cartoon, including a Groogen musician whose "flugel bugle" is destroyed by Pontoffel in an attack flyover, as the ancient Senior Fairy above McGillicuddy who oversees the fairy squadron's worldwide search for the missing Pock and his piano, and as an angry Groogen dairywoman spilt milk upon by a too-close fly-by of Pontoffel's.

The HBO animated adaptation of Madeline, for which Raposo composed the music and songs (with writer/lyricist Judy Rothman), aired four months after Raposo's death; the cartoon The Smoggies, for which Raposo wrote the theme song, premiered in Canada.

Additional film, stage and other television work
Although primarily known for work in live-action and animated children's television, Joe Raposo actually aspired to become a Broadway musical composer.

In 1962, he set Eric Bentley's English-language translation of song texts and poems in Bertolt Brecht's play A Man's a Man at the Loeb Drama Center (in Cambridge, Massachusetts) and the Masque Theatre (New York City). Portions of the production were subsequently shown on CBS-TV, and the entire production (dialogue, songs, and all) was recorded and released on the Spoken Arts label as Spoken Arts SA 870 (1974).

In the 1970s, Raposo wrote original music for the animated film Raggedy Ann & Andy: A Musical Adventure; he later teamed with William Gibson (The Miracle Worker) to create a stage musical about Raggedy Ann. The musical was the first theatre company production from the United States to perform in the Soviet Union upon resumption of cultural relations between the two countries. It later had a brief run on Broadway in 1986.

Raposo also collaborated with Sheldon Harnick (Fiddler on the Roof) on a musical adaptation of the 1946 film It's a Wonderful Life. A Wonderful Life was first performed at the University of Michigan in 1986, and had a successful run at Washington, DC's Arena Stage in 1991. It was performed in concert on Broadway for one night only on December 12, 2005; the production starred Brian Stokes Mitchell, David Hyde Pierce, and Judy Kuhn.

During his career Raposo composed themes for several sitcoms such as Ivan The Terrible, Three's Company, The Ropers and Foot in the Door, film scores such as The Possession of Joel Delaney (1972), Savages (1972) and Maurie (1973), and documentaries, most notably Peter Rosen's production America Is for which Raposo not only scored a patriotic, critically well-received title theme but, unusually, served as its on-screen narrator.

Musical style and influences
Raposo was an ardent fan of satirical composer and bandleader Spike Jones. "The Alligator Song", which Raposo composed for 1970s-era Sesame Street, was Raposo's sound-effects-laden musical homage to Jones. Raposo also composed numerous other works influenced by Jones for Sesame Street, many featuring kazoo and other comical sound-effect objects and instruments like siren whistles, bulb horns, and tenor banjos. Another Raposo composition, "Doggy Paddle", features Raposo barking like several singing dogs during its instrumental verse, a blatant musical homage to the singing and barking dogs of "Memories are Made of This" by Jones and His City Slickers.

Raposo's songwriting tended toward wistful introspections on life and nature. Primarily celebrated for his bright, uptempo major key compositions, he also showed skill at arranging original blues and jazz pieces in minor key and often took sudden melancholy lyrical detours in the midst of otherwise cheerful songs.

Unlike his children's television scoring contemporaries, Raposo exhibited an uncommonly broad grasp of compositional styles. Raposo was classically trained as a conductor and at the École Normale in Paris as an arranger. As a student of Nadia Boulanger in Paris, he extended his facility in piano technique. This classical background gave him the ability to engage different music genres authentically. So diverse were the genres he regularly frequented, that often the only identifying mark of his songs as "Raposo" were common lyric allusions to "sunny days" or "flying", or his signature use of piccolo and glockenspiel atop the melodic or contrapuntal line, as well as the prominent uses of guitar in the rhythmic line.

Most overtly, however, Joe Raposo's sonic trademark was his seemingly obsessive, and often exhaustively authentic, live replication of the tonal quality and exact playback cadence of the 20th-century self-operating player piano when composing for and performing on a grand, baby grand or upright piano. He appears to have specifically tuned his Children's Television Workshop pianos not only to blatantly mimic the player piano in its antique tonality, but to achieve and then maintain what became a signature ragtime tack or saloon-piano sound by them.

Raposo's considerable stylistic ambition during his tenure as music director lent Sesame Street its trademark extreme musical diversity. For The Electric Company, particularly for songs he composed for the Short Circus, he led CTW to pop-record production values and generally strongly enforced an adult musical sophistication for all content he supervised. Given an unusual creative freedom in the Music Department at 1970s CTW, Raposo toggled from convincing country ballads (e.g. "The Ballad of Casey MacPhee," which depicted Cookie Monster as a heroic train engineer caught in a mountain avalanche) and authentic hillbilly ("It's a Long, Hard Climb, But I'm Gonna Get There" and "My Favorite Letter P" among others) to blues elegies of considerable emotional and tonal complexity, like "New Life Coming" and "Bein' Green."

Raposo also evidenced skill as an American funk composer, making frequent and arguably credible musical allusions (on 1970–1974 Sesame Street) to the underground black soul and funk performers of his day. Themes written for muppet Roosevelt Franklin and the segment H exhibit some of Raposo's most convincing soul and funk composition and arrangement; the former contains clear allusions to the Philly Four and Lee Dorsey while the latter attempts coupling a convincing African-American Seventies funk bassline to the cycling musical structure of a European round, all while still somehow retaining his signature high end accents along the upper melodic ramparts of the composition. Raposo also made several stylistic allusions to jazz-funk organist Louis Chachere in compositions Fat, Cat, Sat and Some, All, None, and on both selections played the Hammond B-3 like Chachere, but using its leslies as a comedic device as would have Raposo's idol, Spike Jones.

Vocally, Joe Raposo was a tenor, possessing an unusually warm, buttery attack and an easily identifiable, very stable, mellow trademark vibrato.

Personal life
Raposo was married twice. He had two sons, Joseph and Nicholas, from his first marriage. He had a son, Andrew, and daughter, Elizabeth (Liz), from his marriage to Pat Collins-Sarnoff.

Famous friends
Raposo was a close friend of Frank Sinatra, Tom Lehrer, WNYC radio personality Jonathan Schwartz, and Academy Award-winning filmmaker Bert Salzman.

Sinatra recorded four of Raposo's songs on his 1973 album Ol' Blue Eyes Is Back. Sinatra insisted the album be composed entirely of Raposo's compositions, but the record label balked and prevailed over Sinatra, limiting him to four. Jonathan Schwartz reports that Sinatra idolized and popularized Raposo and his music, frequently attending Raposo's parties at his and first wife Susan's New York apartment during the 1960s with glamorous friends and several cronies, including Leo Durocher. Schwartz's memoir adds that Sinatra was infatuated with Raposo's piano-playing skill and commonly referred to him to others, characteristically, as "Raposo at the piano", or "the genius".

Death
Raposo died on February 5, 1989, in Bronxville, New York, of non-Hodgkin lymphoma, three days before his 52nd birthday. He was survived by wife, Pat Collins, his four children and by his parents who were at the time living in Chatham, Massachusetts. His grave is located at Union Cemetery in Chatham.

In 1998, many of his manuscripts were donated by Collins-Sarnoff to Georgetown University Library.

Raposo was eulogized in the April 1990 documentary Sing! Sesame Street Remembers Joe Raposo and His Music, which was hosted and directed by Sesame Street crew member Jon Stone. A tribute CD was released in 1992 commemorating his work on Sesame Street.

Credits and lecturesFilm Scores – Composer Steinbeck in Memoriam (1966)
 The Frog Prince (1971) (TV movie)
 The Possession of Joel Delaney (1972)
 Savages (1973)
 Big Mo (1974)
 Raggedy Ann & Andy: A Musical Adventure (1977)
 The Great Muppet Caper (1981)Television – Musical Director and/or Composer/Lyricist/Producer Sesame Street (1969–1989)
 The Electric Company (1971–1974)
 Visions (1974–1979)
 Metromedia Television (1967–1969)Theme Songs – Composer or Composer/Lyricist Sesame Street
 The Electric Company
 Three's Company
 We'll Get By
 The Ropers
Shining Time Station
 Madeline
 Steampipe Alley
 The Dr. Fad Show
 CBS Morning News television specials – Music Director/Composer
 America Is (CBS – Emmy Award for Outstanding Children's Program)
 Curious George
 Pontoffel Pock (Dr. Seuss)
 Cabbage Patch Christmas Broadway and Off-Broadway – Composer/Lyricist and/or Musical Director
 A Wonderful Life, with Sheldon Harnick
 Raggedy Ann, with William Gibson
 You're a Good Man Charlie Brown, incidental music with Charles Schulz and Clark Gesner
 Half a Sixpence, with Tommy Steele
 Play It Again, Sam, with Woody Allen
 House of Flowers, incidental music with Harold Arlen and Truman Capote 
 The Mad Show, with David Steinberg and Linda Lavin
 The Office, with Jerome Robbins
 The SmoggiesLecturer'''
 Massachusetts Institute of Technology (MIT)
 Yale University
 Harvard Graduate School of Education
 New York University
 Southern Methodist University

Awards and nominations
Along with five Grammy Awards and Emmy nods, his song "The First Time It Happens," from The Great Muppet Caper, was nominated for the Academy Award for Best Original Song in 1981, losing to "Arthur's Theme (Best That You Can Do)" from the film Arthur''.

See also
 Sesame Street discography
 List of songs from Sesame Street

References

External links
 
 
 A brief biography of Raposo at the Rodgers & Hammerstein Association
 Muppet Central article with photo of Raposo
 

1937 births
1989 deaths
Deaths from non-Hodgkin lymphoma
American lyricists
American film score composers
American male film score composers
American musical theatre composers
Male musical theatre composers
American musical theatre lyricists
American television composers
American tenors
Animated film score composers
Broadway composers and lyricists
American people of Portuguese descent
Grammy Award winners
People from Fall River, Massachusetts
Sesame Street crew
Video game composers
Deaths from cancer in New York (state)
20th-century American singers
Songwriters from Massachusetts
20th-century American pianists
Hasty Pudding alumni
20th-century American composers
American male pianists
20th-century American male singers
B.M.C. Durfee High School alumni